James Andrew "Jim" Polster (born February 8, 1979, in St. Paul, Minnesota) is a volleyball player from the United States, who plays as an outside hitter for the Men's National Team. He competed at the 2002 FIVB Volleyball Men's World Championship in Japan. He played for Long Beach State University, USA.

Honors
 2001 Summer Universiade — 1st place
 2002 World Championship — 9th place (tied)
 2003 World Cup — 4th place
 2003 Pan American Games — 4th place
 2003 NORCECA Championship — 1st place
 2005 America's Cup — 1st place
 2005 NORCECA Championship — 1st place
 2005 World Grand Champions Cup — 2nd place
 2006 World League — 10th place (tied)
 2006 World Championship — 10th place
 2006 Pan-American Cup — 1st place
 2007 World Cup — 4th place
 2007 America's Cup — 1st place
 2007 Pan American Games — 2nd place
 2007 World League — 3rd place

References

External links
 Jim Polster at USA Volleyball

1979 births
Living people
American men's volleyball players
Volleyball players at the 2003 Pan American Games
Volleyball players at the 2007 Pan American Games
PAOK V.C. players
Fenerbahçe volleyballers
Pan American Games silver medalists for the United States
Pan American Games medalists in volleyball
Medalists at the 2007 Pan American Games
Long Beach State Beach men's volleyball players